Mitsu may refer to:

 Mitsubishi Motors, a Japanese multinational automotive manufacturer

Places 
 Mitsu, Hyōgo, former town in Hyogo Prefecture, Japan
 Mitsu, Okayama, former town in Okayama Prefecture, Japan

People 
 Okita Mitsu (1833 – 1907), eldest daughter of a Japanese samurai family
 Mitsu Kōro (1893 – 1980), Japanese politician
 Mitsu Yashima (1908 – 1988), Japanese artist, author, and activist
 Mitsu Arakawa (1927 – 1997), American professional wrestler
 Mitsu Tanaka (born 1945) Japanese feminist and writer
 Mitsu Shimojo (born 1955), Japanese politician
 Mitsu Murata (born 1977), Japanese actor and music producer
 Mitsu Dan (born 1980), Japanese actress and writer
 Mitsu Kusabue, a fictional character in the manga series Rozen Maiden

See also
 Mitu (disambiguation)
 Mittu (disambiguation)
 Mithu (disambiguation)